Charles Goring (14 July 1817 – 17 November 1849) was a British Conservative politician and first-class cricketer.

Goring was the son of Charles Goring (1744–1797) and Mary née Ballard, and brother of John Goring (born 1824). He was educated at Winchester College, and matriculated at Christ Church, Oxford in 1835. He graduated B.A. there in 1843, and M.A. in 1847. While studying at Oxford, he played first-class cricket for Oxford University from 1836–38, making four appearances.

Goring was elected Conservative Member of Parliament for New Shoreham at the 1841 general election and held the seat until his death in 1849. He married Juliana Mary Caroline Dixie, daughter of Sir William Willoughy Wolstan Dixie, 7th Baronet on 19 September 1849, but died two months later. His brother, William Goring, was also a first-class cricketer.

References

External links
 

1817 births
1849 deaths
People from Shoreham-by-Sea
People educated at Winchester College
Alumni of Christ Church, Oxford
English cricketers
Oxford University cricketers
Conservative Party (UK) MPs for English constituencies
UK MPs 1841–1847
UK MPs 1847–1852